The 1864 Democratic National Convention was held at The Amphitheatre in Chicago, Illinois.

The Convention nominated Major General George B. McClellan from New Jersey for president, and Representative George H. Pendleton of Ohio for vice president. McClellan, age 37 at the time of the convention, and Pendleton, age 39, are the youngest major party presidential ticket ever nominated in the United States.

Background 
The Democratic Party was bitterly split over the American Civil War between the War Democrats and the Peace Democrats. Also making matters complicated were the factions that existed among the Peace Democrats. For much of the war they had been dominated by the Copperheads, led by Clement Vallandigham. The Copperheads declared the war to be a failure and favored an immediate end to hostilities without securing Union victory, either via re-admitting all the Confederate states with slavery intact and legally protected, or by formally recognizing the Confederacy as a sovereign nation and attempting to re-establish peaceful relationships.

As the tide of the war began to turn, the Peace Democrats started to splinter between the Copperheads and their more moderate members. After the Battle of Gettysburg, when it was clear the Confederacy could no longer win the war, moderate Peace Democrats such as Horatio Seymour proposed a negotiated peace that would secure Union victory. They believed this was the best course of action because an armistice could finish the war without destroying the South. The Copperheads continued to advocate allowing the Confederate states to rejoin with slavery intact, however, believing that to do otherwise would merely lead to another Civil War sooner or later.

Platform 
On the first day of the convention, a peace platform was adopted. McClellan, the front-runner for the Democratic nomination, was personally opposed to a peace platform. McClellan supported the continuation of the war and restoration of the Union, but the party platform, written by Vallandigham, was opposed to this position.

Presidential nomination

Presidential candidates

Declined 

General George B. McClellan had widespread support from the War Democrats, and was generally seen as the front-runner. The Peace Democrats, however, found it much harder to come up with a candidate. Many of them had hoped that Horatio Seymour would act as their standard-bearer, but early in 1864 he broke with the Copperheads and aligned himself with the more moderate Peace Democrats. Many of his allies tried to get him to run anyway, believing that he would be an acceptable compromise candidate who could stop McClellan from being nominated, but on the day before the convention commenced, Seymour announced positively that he would not be a candidate. Nonetheless, a portion of the Illinois delegation placed Seymour's name in nomination during the convention. Seymour himself, acting as chairman of the Convention, declared that the Illinois delegate was "not in order" since a different motion was already under discussion.

Vallandigham, the ideological leader of the Copperheads, recognized that he was too divisive a figure to earn the required two-thirds majority at the convention (indeed, he would be loudly booed by the War Democrats and even some of the more moderate Peace Democrats when he delivered a speech on the first day), and declined to put his name forward. Instead, the Copperheads eventually put forward former governor Thomas H. Seymour of Connecticut. Other candidates were placed in nomination before eventually being withdrawn. Senator Lazarus W. Powell was placed in nomination by the Delaware delegation, but Powell personally asked that his name be withdrawn since he believed the eventual Democratic presidential candidate "should come from one of the non-slaveholding States." Amid "great applause", a portion of the Kentucky delegation placed the name of former President Franklin Pierce before the convention. But Pierce's name was withdrawn from consideration when a delegate revealed that he had received both written and verbal instructions from Pierce stating that he did not wish to be presented as a candidate.

As the first ballot began, McClellan took a commanding lead over Seymour, with the support of both the War Democrats and the moderate Peace Democrats. The Copperheads, realizing that trying to stop McClellan's nomination would most likely be futile, soon started to throw their votes behind the general, who finished comfortably in excess of the required two-thirds majority at the end of the first ballot. A motion to have McClellan's nomination be declared unanimous was carried.

Vice Presidential nomination

Vice Presidential candidates

Declined 

Eight names were placed in nomination: George H. Pendleton, James Guthrie, Lazarus W. Powell, George W. Cass, John D. Caton, Daniel W. Voorhees, Augustus C. Dodge, and John S. Phelps. Following the first ballot roll call, the names of Guthrie, Powell, Caton, and Phelps were withdrawn from consideration when it was revealed none of them desired the nomination. Before the first ballot could be finalized, 70 delegates who had supported one of the withdrawn candidates shifted their votes to Pendleton. As a result, Pendleton was supported by a majority of the delegates when the vote for the first ballot was finalized. With the exception of Pendleton, the remaining contenders were favorite son candidates who only had the support of their home states. During the second ballot roll call, each state recorded its vote for Pendleton.

Pendleton, a close associate of Vallandigham, was an Extreme Peace Democrat representative from the electoral-rich state of Ohio. Since the Democrats were divided by issues of war and peace, Pendleton's well-known rejection of the Lincoln administration's assertion of the constitutional right to coerce a state back into the Union balanced the ticket.

See also 
 History of the United States Democratic Party
 List of Democratic National Conventions
 U.S. presidential nomination convention
 1864 Republican National Convention
 1864 United States presidential election

References

Bibliography 
 Official proceedings of the Democratic national convention, held in 1864 at Chicago

External links 
 Democratic Party Platform of 1864 at The American Presidency Project

1864 United States presidential election
1864 in Illinois
1860s in Chicago
Political conventions in Chicago
George B. McClellan
Democratic Party of Illinois
Political events in Illinois
Democratic National Conventions
1864 conferences
August 1864 events